Ōhau A is a power station operated by Meridian Energy in the South Island of New Zealand.

It is located on the artificial Ōhau canal. The dam is fed by water from Lake Ōhau and Lake Pukaki and spills into the artificial Lake Ruataniwha.

It is part of the Waitaki hydro scheme which consists of eight power stations operated from a control centre near Twizel. Construction of the power station commenced in 1971.

See also

Ōhau B
Ōhau C
List of power stations in New Zealand
Electricity sector in New Zealand

References

Further reading

External links

Meridian Energy - power station information

Energy infrastructure completed in 1980
Hydroelectric power stations in New Zealand
Buildings and structures in Canterbury, New Zealand